Girgensohnia is a small genus of plants in the family Amaranthaceae.

Girgensohnia contains five species:
Girgensohnia bungeana 
Girgensohnia diptera 
Girgensohnia imbricata 
Girgensohnia minima 
Girgensohnia oppositiflora

References

Amaranthaceae
Amaranthaceae genera